In European elections, Kuyavian-Pomeranian is a constituency of the European Parliament. It consists of the Kuyavian-Pomeranian Voivodeship.

Nomenclature 
The relevant Polish legislation ("The Act of 23 January 2004 on Elections to the European Parliament") establishing the constituencies does not give the constituencies formal names. Instead, each constituency has a number, territorial description, and location of the Constituency Electoral Commission. The 2004 Polish National Election Commission and the 2004 European Parliament Election website uses the territorial description when referring to the constituency, not the electoral commission location.

Election results

2004 

Elections to the European Parliament were held in Poland on 2004-06-13.

2009 

Elections to the European Parliament were held in Poland on 7 June 2009. List liders:
 Civic Platform (PO): Tadeusz Zwiefka (MEP since 2004)
 Democratic Left Alliance (SLD): Janusz Zemke (Sejm member since 1989, Vice-Ministry of National Defence 2001–05)
 Law and Justice (PiS): Ryszard Czarnecki (MEP since 2004 from Lower Silesian and Opole)
 Polish People's Party (PSL): Eugeniusz Kłopotek (Sejm member 1997–05, since 2007)

Opinion polling 

 * - in March' opinion polling as PiS' list lider was Kosma Złotowski (Mayor of Bydgoszcz 1994-95, Sejm member 1997-01, Senate member 2005-07)

Results 

www.pe2009.pkw.gov.pl

List of MEPs 

 Ryszard Czarnecki - Law and Justice-Alliance for Europe of the Nations (2009-14)
 Janusz Zemke - Democratic Left Alliance-Party of European Socialists (2009-14)
 Tadeusz Zwiefka - Civic Platform-European People's Party (2004-09, 2009-14)

See also 
 European Parliament constituency
 Kuyavian-Pomeranian Voivodeship

References

External links 
 European Election News by European Election Law Association (Eurela)

European Parliament constituencies in Poland
European Parliament
2004 establishments in Poland
Constituencies established in 2004